A commune is the smallest administrative subdivision in Chile. It may contain cities, towns, villages, hamlets as well as rural areas.  In highly populated areas, such as Santiago, Valparaíso and Concepción, a conurbation may be broken into several communes. In sparsely populated areas, conversely, a commune may cover a substantial rural area together with several settled areas which could range from hamlets to towns or cities.

The term "commune" is ambiguous in English, but the word is commonly used in translation for "comuna", although with some controversy among translators. A comuna is similar to a "county" in Anglo-American usage and practice, and may be more universally understood as a "municipality".

Each commune or municipality is governed by a directly elected body known as a municipal council (concejo municipal) consisting of a mayor (alcalde) and a group of councillors (concejales), for a period of four years. The communal civil service administration is known as the municipality (municipalidad) and is headquartered at the mayor's office (alcaldía). According to Chilean law, a single municipality may administer one or more communes, though currently, the only such case is the municipality of Cabo de Hornos, which administers the communes of Antártica and Cabo de Hornos.

Chile's 346 communes are grouped into 56 provinces (provincia, pl. provincias), which are themselves grouped into 16 regions (región, pl. regiones).

List of communes by region and province
Traditionally, Chilean regions are listed in geographical order starting with the northernmost region, leaving the Santiago Metropolitan Region at the end. The following table lists all Chilean communes, providing a complete list of administrative divisions at all levels. Each commune's municipality website is given along with the area and population from the National Statistics Institute's most recent census conducted in 2002.

See also
Administrative divisions of Chile
Regions of Chile
Provinces of Chile
List of towns in Chile
List of cities in Chile

References

External links
 Municipalities in Chile, directory of official links for each municipality 

 
Subdivisions of Chile
Communes
Communes, Chile